The Metropolis Bridge is a railroad bridge which spans the Ohio River at Metropolis, Illinois. Originally built for the Chicago, Burlington and Quincy Railroad, construction began in 1914 under the direction of engineer Ralph Modjeski.

The bridge consists of the following: (from north to south)

 Deck plate-girder approach spans
 One riveted, 9-panel Parker through truss
 Five pin-connected, Pennsylvania through trusses
 One pin-connected, 8-panel Pratt deck truss
 Deck plate-girder approach spans

The largest span stretches , and remains the longest pin-connected simple through truss span in the world. Cost of the bridge when built was $4,000,000. (USD)

Not long after completion in 1917, ownership of the bridge was passed on to the Paducah and Illinois Railroad, a newly formed railroad jointly owned by the Chicago, Burlington and Quincy Railroad and Nashville, Chattanooga and St. Louis Railway. In 1925, the Illinois Central Railroad purchased a 1/3 share of the Paducah and Illinois Railroad, and assumed operations and maintenance, as the bridge served as an important link in their newly completed Edgewood-Fulton Cutoff route.

As of 2013, the bridge is still owned by the Paducah and Illinois Railroad, with operations managed by the Canadian National Railway and bridge maintenance/inspection managed by BNSF Railway, where it continues to see heavy use.

References

External links
 Historic Bridges of the United States

Bridges completed in 1917
Railroad bridges in Illinois
Railroad bridges in Kentucky
Buildings and structures in McCracken County, Kentucky
Buildings and structures in Massac County, Illinois
Bridges over the Ohio River
Chicago, Burlington and Quincy Railroad
Illinois Central Railroad
Louisville and Nashville Railroad
Metal bridges in the United States
Pennsylvania truss bridges in the United States
Pratt truss bridges in the United States
Parker truss bridges in the United States
1917 establishments in Illinois
1917 establishments in Kentucky
Transportation in Massac County, Illinois
Transportation in McCracken County, Kentucky